Lisa Beth Spanierman is an American psychologist who is professor and faculty head of Counseling and Counseling Psychology in the College of Integrative Sciences and Arts at Arizona State University. Her research focuses on racial attitudes, microaggressions, and related topics. A fellow of the American Psychological Association, she received the Fritz and Lynn Kuder Early Career Award from the Association's Society of Counseling Psychology in 2012. She is the co-author of the book Microaggressions in Everyday Life.

References

External links
 Faculty page
 

Living people
American women psychologists
Arizona State University faculty
Columbia University alumni
University of Missouri alumni
Fellows of the American Psychological Association
Year of birth missing (living people)
21st-century American women